The Detroit Tigers are a professional baseball team based in Detroit, Michigan. The Tigers are members of the American League Central Division in Major League Baseball. In baseball, the head coach of a team is called the manager, or more formally, the field manager. The duties of the team manager include team strategy and leadership on and off the field.  The team initially began in the now defunct Western League in 1894, and later became one of the American League's eight charter franchises in 1901. Since the inception of the team in 1894, it has employed 48 different managers. The Tigers' current manager is A. J. Hinch, who was named manager on October 30, 2020, following the sudden retirement of Ron Gardenhire.
 
The franchise's first manager after the team's arrival in the American League was George Stallings, who managed the team for one season. Hall of Famer Hughie Jennings, who managed the team from 1907 to 1920, led the team to three American League championships. Jennings however was unable to win the World Series, losing to the Chicago Cubs in 1907 and 1908 and the Pittsburgh Pirates in 1909. The Detroit Tigers did not win their first World Series until 1935 under the leadership of player-manager Mickey Cochrane. Steve O'Neill later led the Tigers to another World Series victory again in 1945. The Tigers would not win another World Series until 1968 World Series when the Tigers, led by Mayo Smith, defeated the St. Louis Cardinals. Sparky Anderson's 1984 Detroit Tigers team was the franchise's last World Series victory, and marked the first time in Major League Baseball history that a manager won the World Series in both leagues. In total, the Tigers have won the American League pennant 10 times, and the World Series 4 times.

The longest tenured Tiger manager was Sparky Anderson. Anderson managed the team for 2,579 games from 1979 to 1995. Hughie Jennings, Bucky Harris and Jim Leyland are the only other Detroit Tiger managers who have managed the team for more than 1,000 games. Anderson's 1331 wins and 1248 losses also lead all Tiger managers, while Cochrane's winning percentage of .582 is the highest of any Tiger manager who has managed at least one full-season. Eight Hall of Famers have managed the Tigers: Ed Barrow, Jennings, Ty Cobb, Cochrane, Joe Gordon, Bucky Harris, Alan Trammell, and Anderson. Barrow was elected as an executive, Jennings and Anderson were elected as managers; the others were elected as players.

Key

Managers

Western League

American League
Through September 18, 2020

Managers with multiple tenures

Notes
A running total of the number of managers of the Tigers. Thus, any manager who has two or more separate terms as a manager is only counted once.

References

Detroit Tigers
Managers